Narayan Murlidhar Gupte (1 June 1872 –  30 August 1947), also known as Kavi Bee, was an Indian poet and scholar of English, Sanskrit and Marathi literature.

References
 K. M. George Modern Indian Literature, an Anthology: Surveys and poems
 Nirmala Anant Kanekar(1972) "Bee" Kavi: Charitra wa Kavya-charcha (Marathi biography) Shri Lekhan Wachan Bhandar, Thokal Bhavan, Laxmi Road, Poona-30, 160 pp. 1972.

1872 births
1947 deaths
19th-century Indian poets
20th-century Indian poets
Indian male poets
19th-century Indian male writers
20th-century Indian male writers